The Grand Chess Tour (GCT) is a circuit of chess tournaments where players compete for multiple prize pools.  Major tournaments that have been featured in the Grand Chess Tour include Norway Chess, the Sinquefield Cup, and the London Chess Classic.

History 
The Grand Chess Tour was announced on April 24, 2015, at the Chess Club and Scholastic Center of Saint Louis in St. Louis, Missouri prior to the Battle of the Legends: Garry Kasparov vs Nigel Short match. The tour was designed to promote competitive chess by including all of the top players and the World Champion Magnus Carlsen in a single circuit.  With the combination of several established tournaments, the Grand Chess Tour aimed to create a large prize pool which would be attractive to the players and media alike.

The first Grand Chess Tour took place across three tournaments,  Norway Chess, the Sinquefield Cup, and the London Chess Classic with each tournament in the Grand Chess Tour having the same prize fund, structure, and time controls. The overall prize pool for the first Grand Chess Tour was $1,050,000, with $300,000 for each tournament and a $150,000 prize for the top three players across the entire circuit.

In 2015, nine "standard" players competed in each tournament in the Grand Chess Tour, with a tenth wildcard player is selected by the organizing committee of each individual event.  In 2016, there were eight standard players, and two wildcards per event. Players earn tour points based on their performance at each event.  The top three players who accumulate the most tour points across all events receive extra prize money, taken from the Grand Chess Tour prize fund, and automatic invitations to the following year's Grand Chess Tour.  Wildcard players receive tour points for any tournaments in which they participate.

The point breakdown and prize money for each classical tournament is as follows:

{| class="wikitable" style="text-align:center;"
! Place !! Points !! Event standings !! Overall standings
|-
| 1st || 13/12* || $75,000  || $75,000 
|-
| 2nd || 10 || $50,000  || $50,000 
|-
| 3rd || 8 || $40,000  || $25,000
|- 
| 4th || 7 || $30,000  || 
|-
|  5th || 6 || $25,000  || 
|-
|  6th || 5||  $20,000  || 
|-
|  7th || 4|| $15,000  || 
|-
| 8th || 3||  $15,000  || 
|-
|  9th || 2 || $15,000  || 
|-
| 10th || 1 ||  $15,000  || 
|}

 If a player shares 1st place and wins the tiebreak (*), they earn 12 points rather than the 13 points awarded to an outright winner.
 Rapid and blitz events have the prize money halved.

Winners

{| class="sortable wikitable"
! # !! Year !! Winner
|-
|align="center"|1||2015||
|-
|align="center"|2||2016||
|-
|align="center"|3||2017||
|-
|align="center"|4||2018||
|-
|align="center"|5||2019||
|-
|align="center"|6||2021||
|-
|align="center"|7||2022||
|}

Grand Chess Tour 2015 

In 2015, the Grand Chess Tour invited the top-10 players in the world ranked by the January 2015 FIDE rating list.  Maxime Vachier-Lagrave, the 11th ranked player in February 2015, was invited as the ninth player to compete after 8th ranked Vladimir Kramnik and 10th ranked Wesley So declined to participate. Jon Ludvig Hammer was selected to participate in the 2015  Norway Chess Tournament after qualifying through a wildcard tournament.  Wesley So and Michael Adams were selected to participate in the Sinquefield Cup and the London Chess Classic, respectively.

The results of the 2015 Grand Chess Tour.  Tour points in bold indicate a tournament win.
{| class="wikitable sortable" style="text-align:center;"
!
!Player
!  December 2015 
!  
! 
! 
! 
! 
|-
|-style="background:#ccffcc;"
| 1 || align=left |  || 2834|| 4 || 10 || 12 || 26 || $215,000
|-
| 2 || align=left |  || 2784 || 7 || 6 || 10 || 23 || $155,000
|-
| 3 || align=left |  ||2788|| 2 || 13 || 7 || 22 || $145,000
|-
| 4 || align=left |  || 2773 || 5 || 7 || 8 || 20 || $90,000
|-
| 5 || align=left |  || 2793 || 8 || 8 || 3 || 19 || $95,000
|-
| 6 || align=left |  ||2803||  13 || 4 || 1 || 18 || $105,000
|-
| 7 || align=left |  || 2747 || 3 || 5 || 6 || 14 || $60,000
|-
| 8 || align=left |  || 2796|| 10 || 2 || 2 || 14 || $80,000
|-
| 9 || align=left |  || 2787|| 6 || 3 || 4.5 || 13.5 || $55,000
|-
| 10 || align=left |  || 2737 ||  style="background:#eee;"|  ||  style="background:#eee;"|  || 4.5 || 4.5 ||$20,000
|-
| 11 || align=left |  || 2695 || 1 ||  style="background:#eee;"|  || style="background:#eee;"|  || 1 || $15,000
|-
| 12 || align=left |  ||  2775 || style="background:#eee;"|  || 1 || style="background:#eee;"| || 1 || $15,000
|}

Grand Chess Tour 2016 
On January 6, 2016, the Altibox Norway Chess event announced it would not be part of the Grand Chess Tour in 2016.

On February 11, 2016, the GCT announced it was adding two rapid/blitz tournaments for 2016, sponsored by Colliers International France (Paris), and Your Next Move (Leuven).

For 2016, an initial roster of eight players was created based upon the rules published on the GCT website. The Initial Roster consisted of the three top finishers in the 2015 GCT and the next five highest players by rating will be the average of each monthly FIDE supplement from February through December inclusive, as well as the live ratings after the 2015 London Chess Classic. Maxime Vachier-Lagrave was subsequently added to the roster as the GCT Wild Card Player for all 4 events.

World Champion Magnus Carlsen declined participation in the two classic events but competed as a wild card in the rapid/blitz tournaments held in both Paris and Leuven. All other players accepted the invitations for all four tournaments with the exception of Viswanathan Anand who declined the invitation to the Paris tournament. Since GCT Tour Points were based on the best three tournament results, Anand remained eligible for the overall tour prizes. For the Sinquefield Cup, Vladimir Kramnik had to withdraw due to health issues and was replaced by Peter Svidler.

The wildcards were as follows:

{| class="wikitable sortable" style="text-align:center;"
!Player
!Event 
|-
| align=left |  || Paris & Leuven
|-
| align=left |  || Paris
|-
| align=left |  ||St Louis
|-
| align=left |  || St Louis
|-
| align=left |  ||London
|}

The results of the 2016 Grand Chess Tour.  Tour points in bold indicate a tournament win.

{| class="wikitable sortable" style="text-align:center;"
!Player
! FIDE rating June 2016 
! Paris GCT
! Leuven GCT
! Sinquefield Cup
! London Chess Classic
! Total points
! Prize money
|-style="background:#ccffcc;"
| align="left" |  ||  2770 ||  || 10 ||13||13||36|| $295,000
|-
| align=left |  || 2787 || 13 ||  ||4.5|| 7 ||24.5|| $144,166
|-
| align=left |  || 2804 ||  || 6 ||7.75|| 10 ||23.75|| $108,750
|-
| align=left |  || 2855 || 10 || 13 || style="background:#eee;"| || style="background:#eee;"| ||  23 || $67,500
|-
| align="left" |  || 2792 || 6 || 8 || 7.75 ||  ||21.75|| $81,250
|-
| align="left" |  || 2782 || style="background:#eee;" | || 7 ||7.75|| 7 ||21.75|| $82,916
|-
| align=left |  || 2787 || 8 || 5 ||4.5||  ||17.5|| $55,000
|-
| align=left |  || 2770 || 4 || 2.5 || style="background:#eee;"| || 7 || 13.5 || $46,666
|-
| align=left |  || 2812 || 5 || 2.5 |||| 5 ||12.5|| $50,000
|-
| align="left" |  ||2761 || 2 || 1 ||7.75||  ||10.75|| $66,250
|-
| align=left |  || 2783 || style="background:#eee;"| ||  style="background:#eee;"| ||3|| style="background:#eee;"| ||3|| $15,000
|-
| align="left" |  || 2727 || style="background:#eee;"| || style="background:#eee;" | || style="background:#eee;"| || 3 || 3 || $15,000
|-
| align=left |  || 2751 || style="background:#eee;"| ||  style="background:#eee;"| || 2 || style="background:#eee;"| || 2 || $15,000
|-
| align="left" |  || 2687 || 1 || style="background:#eee;" | || style="background:#eee;" | || style="background:#eee;" | || 1 || $7,500
|}

Grand Chess Tour 2017 

The 2017 Grand Chess Tour consisted of five events: three rapid and blitz chess, and two classical chess. By January 2017, six players had qualified for the 2017 Grand Chess Tour; on January 3, three wildcard selections for the tour were announced, bringing the total number of participants to nine.  Vladimir Kramnik declined to participate in the 2017 GCT, citing a busy summer schedule.  He was replaced by Levon Aronian.

On July 5, Garry Kasparov agreed to join the St. Louis Rapid & Blitz tournament as a wildcard.

Players
{| class="wikitable sortable"
! Player
! Qualification method
! URS rating January 2017 
! FIDE rating January 2017 
|-
| align="left" |  || GCT 2016 Winner || 2777 || 2808
|-
| align=left |  || GCT 2016 Runner-Up || 2787 || 2785
|-
| align=left |  || GCT 2016 3rd place || 2779 || 2827
|-
| align=left |  || 1st 2016 FIDE Average rating || 2852 || 2840
|-
| align=left |  || 2nd 2016 FIDE Average rating  || 2787 || 2811
|-
| align=left |  || 3rd 2016 FIDE Average rating || 2774 || 2796
|-
| align=left |  || WC (1st URS 1 January 2017 not picked) || 2779 || 2767
|-
| align=left |  || WC (2nd URS 1 January 2017 not picked) || 2778 || 2785
|-
| align=left |  || WC || 2771 || 2786
|-
| align=left |  || WC (Alternate) || 2771 || 2780 
|-
| align=left |  || WC (Leuven)|| 2787 || 2811
|-
| align=left |  || WC (Paris) || 2771 || 2742
|-
| align=left |  || WC (Paris) || 2768 || 2766
|-
| align=left |  || WC (Paris) || ? || 2739
|-
| align=left |  || WC (Paris) || ? || 2695
|-
| align=left |  || WC (Leuven) || ? || 2701
|-
| align=left |  || WC (Leuven) || 2760 || 2752
|-
| align=left |  || WC (Leuven) || 2757 || 2773
|-
| align=left |  || WC (St. Louis) ||  ? || 2748
|-
| align=left |  || WC (St. Louis Rapid & Blitz) || N/A || N/A
|-
| align=left |  || WC (St. Louis Rapid & Blitz) ||  ? ||  2739
|-
| align=left |  || WC (St. Louis Rapid & Blitz) ||  ?  || 2735
|-
| align=left |  || WC (St. Louis Rapid & Blitz) || ?  || 2718
|-
| align=left |  || WC (London) || ? || 2751
|}

Results
{| class="wikitable sortable" style="text-align:center;"
! Player
! Paris GCT  June 21–25
! Leuven GCT  June 28 – July 2
! Sinquefield Cup  July 31 – August 12
! Saint Louis Rapid & Blitz  August 13–20
! London Chess Classic  November 30 – December 11
! Total points
! Prize money
|-style="background:#ccffcc;"
| align=left |  || 12 || 13 || 9 ||style="background:#eee;"| || 7 || 41 ||$245,417
|-
| align=left |   || 10 || 8 || 13 ||style="background:#eee;"| || 7 || 38 ||$207,917
|-
| align=left |   ||style="background:#eee;"| || 5.5 || 6.5 || 13 || 4 || 29 ||$91,250
|-
| align="left" |  || 8 || style="background:#eee;" | || 3 || 9 || 5 || 25 ||$77,500
|-
| align="left" |   || 3 || style="background:#eee;" | || 4 || 5 || 12 || 24 ||$95,000
|-
| align=left |   || 5 ||style="background:#eee;"| || 6.5 || 9 || 3 || 23.5 ||$75,000
|-
| align="left" |  || 4 || 10 || 1.5 ||style="background:#eee;"| || 7 || 22.5 ||$79,167
|-
| align="left" |   || style="background:#eee;" | || 4 || 1.5 || 7 || 10 || 22.5 ||$100,000
|-
| align=left |   ||style="background:#eee;"| || 3 || 9 || 2 || 1.5 || 15.5 ||$75,000
|-
| align=left |   ||style="background:#eee;"|  || 7 || style="background:#eee;"| || style="background:#eee;"|  ||  style="background:#eee;"| || 7 ||$15,000
|-
| align=left |    || 7 ||style="background:#eee;"| || style="background:#eee;"| || style="background:#eee;"| || style="background:#eee;"| || 7 ||$15,000
|-
| align=left |    || 6 ||style="background:#eee;"| || style="background:#eee;"| || style="background:#eee;"| || style="background:#eee;"| || 6 ||$12,500
|-
| align=left |   ||style="background:#eee;"|  || 5.5 ||style="background:#eee;"| || style="background:#eee;"| || style="background:#eee;"| || 5.5 ||$11,250
|-
| align=left |    ||style="background:#eee;"|  || style="background:#eee;"| || 5 || style="background:#eee;"| || style="background:#eee;"| || 5 ||$20,000
|-
| align=left |  ||style="background:#eee;"|  || style="background:#eee;"| || style="background:#eee;"|  || 5 || style="background:#eee;"| || 5 ||$10,000
|-
| align=left |  ||style="background:#eee;"|  || style="background:#eee;"| || style="background:#eee;"|  || 5 || style="background:#eee;"| || 5 ||$10,000
|-
| align=left |  ||style="background:#eee;"|  || style="background:#eee;"| || style="background:#eee;"|  || 3 || style="background:#eee;"| || 3 ||$7,500
|-
| align=left |   ||style="background:#eee;"|  || 2 || style="background:#eee;"| ||style="background:#eee;"| || style="background:#eee;"| || 2 ||$7,500
|-
| align=left |   || 2 ||style="background:#eee;"| || style="background:#eee;"| ||style="background:#eee;"| || style="background:#eee;"| || 2 ||$7,500
|-
| align="left" |  || style="background:#eee;" |  || style="background:#eee;" | || style="background:#eee;" |  || style="background:#eee;" | || 1.5 || 1.5 ||$15,000
|-
| align=left |    || 1 ||style="background:#eee;"| || style="background:#eee;"| ||style="background:#eee;"| || style="background:#eee;"| || 1 ||$7,500
|-
| align=left |    ||style="background:#eee;"|  || 1 || style="background:#eee;"| ||style="background:#eee;"| || style="background:#eee;"| || 1 ||$7,500
|-
| align=left |  ||style="background:#eee;"|  || style="background:#eee;"| || style="background:#eee;"|  || 1 || style="background:#eee;"| || 1 ||$7,500
|}

Note that wildcard players were not eligible for the overall prize funds.

Grand Chess Tour 2018 
The Grand Chess Tour 2018 saw a format change. While the first four events retained the same rules, the last event – the London Chess Classic – served as the semifinals and finals for the top four players from the first four events and consisted of a classical, rapid and blitz section. After tying for fourth place, Fabiano Caruana qualified for the final event by beating Wesley So in a playoff 1.5–0.5. Hikaru Nakamura emerged victorious at the London Chess Classic and clinched the Grand Chess Tour's top prize by beating Maxime Vachier-Lagrave in the blitz section.

Results

Semifinals and finals at the London Chess Classic (2018) 
In 2018, the London Chess Classic served as the semifinals and finals for the top four players from the 2018 Grand Chess Tour.

The players played 2 classical games, 2 rapid games, and 4 blitz games. 6 points were awarded for a win, 3 points for a draw and 0 points for a loss in classical play. In the rapid games, 4 points were awarded for a win, 2 points for a draw, and 0 points for a loss. In the blitz games, 2 points were awarded for a win, 1 point for a draw and 0 points for a loss.

After seven consecutive draws that opened his final match with Vachier-Lagrave, Nakamura clinched an event victory by defeating Vachier-Lagrave in the fourth and final blitz game.

Grand Chess Tour 2019 

The 2019 Grand Chess Tour featured 8 tournaments, with 12 full participants and 14 wild card participants. Of the first 7 tournaments, 5 were rapid/blitz tournaments and 2 were classical tournaments. The 12 full participants played in the classical events and in 3 of the 5 rapid/blitz tournaments. As in 2018, the top 4 players after the 7 events qualified for the GCT Finals at the London Chess Classic.

The wildcards were as follows:

{| class="wikitable sortable" style="text-align:center;"
!Player
!Event 
|-
| align=left |  || Côte d'Ivoire
|-
| align=left |  || Côte d'Ivoire
|-
| align=left |  ||Côte d'Ivoire
|-
| align=left |  || Paris
|-
| align=left |  ||Paris
|-
| align=left |  ||Paris
|-
| align=left |  ||St. Louis
|-
| align=left |  ||St. Louis
|-
| align=left |  ||St. Louis
|-
| align=left |  ||Superbet
|-
| align=left |  ||Superbet
|-
| align=left |  ||Superbet
|-
| align=left |  ||Tata Steel
|-
| align=left |  ||Tata Steel
|}

The tour points were awarded as follows:
{| class="wikitable" style="text-align:center;"
! Place !! Points (classical) !! Points (rapid/blitz)
|-
| 1st || 18/20* || 12/13*
|-
| 2nd || 15 || 10
|-
| 3rd || 12 || 8
|- 
| 4th || 10 || 7
|-
|  5th || 8  || 6
|-
|  6th || 7 || 5
|-
|  7th || 6 || 4
|-
| 8th || 5 || 3
|-
|  9th || 4 || 2
|-
| 10th || 3 || 1
|-
| 11th || 2 || N/A
|-
| 12th || 1 || N/A
|}

 If a player wins 1st place outright, they are awarded 20 points instead of 18 (classical), and 13 instead of 12 (rapid/blitz).
 Tour points are shared equally between tied players.

Results

Semifinals and finals at the London Chess Classic
As in 2018, the London Chess Classic served as the semifinals and finals for the top four players from the 2019 Grand Chess Tour.

The players played 2 classical games, 2 rapid games, and 4 blitz games. 
In classical play,  6 points were awarded for a win, 3 points for a draw and 0 points for a loss. 
In the rapid games, 4 points were awarded for a win, 2 points for a draw, and 0 points for a loss. 
In the blitz games, 2 points were awarded for a win, 1 point for a draw and 0 points for a loss. 
All games were played, even after the match result had been decided.

Vachier-Lagrave won the rapid playoff against Carlsen 1½–½ to advance to the final.

Grand Chess Tour 2020 
The 2020 Grand Chess Tour was to feature 5 tournaments, with 10 full participants and 10 wild card participants. 3 tournaments were to be rapid/blitz tournaments and 2 were to have been classical tournaments. The 10 full participants would have played in the classical events and in 2 of the 3 rapid/blitz tournaments. Unlike previous years, there was scheduled to be no Grand Chess Tour finals, due to a busy chess schedule, which includes the Candidates Tournament and the World Chess Championship match.

The 2020 series was cancelled on 3 April 2020 due to the COVID-19 pandemic.

Grand Chess Tour 2021 

The Grand Chess Tour 2021 was held in 2021 with the same 5 Tournaments as the cancelled 2020 Tournament was to have. There were 9 full tour participants who were supposed to play in both Classical Tournaments as well as 2 out of the 3 rapid and blitz tournaments. There were also to be 10 wildcards participants who played in one of the rapid and blitz events. Due to travel restrictions, not all Tour players competed in both classical tournaments, and there ended up being 19 wildcards.

The tour points are awarded as follows:
{| class="wikitable" style="text-align:center;"
! Place !! Points
|-
| 1st || 12/13*
|-
| 2nd || 10
|-
| 3rd || 8
|- 
| 4th || 7
|-
|  5th || 6
|-
|  6th || 5
|-
|  7th || 4
|-
| 8th || 3
|-
|  9th || 2
|-
| 10th || 1
|}

 If a player wins 1st place outright (without the need for a playoff), they are awarded 13 points instead of 12.
 Tour points are shared equally between tied players.

Results 
The wildcards (in italics) are not counted in overall standings.

Grand Chess Tour 2022 

The Grand Chess Tour 2022 was held in 2022 with 5 tournaments, with the Superbet Rapid & Blitz in Poland replacing the Paris GCT Rapid & Blitz from the previous Grand Chess Tour. There were 9 full tour participants who were supposed to play in both Classical Tournaments as well as 2 out of the 3 rapid and blitz tournaments. There were also 9 wildcards participants who played in one of the rapid and blitz events.

The tour points were awarded as follows:
{| class="wikitable" style="text-align:center;"
! Place !! Points
|-
| 1st || 12/13*
|-
| 2nd || 10
|-
| 3rd || 8
|- 
| 4th || 7
|-
|  5th || 6
|-
|  6th || 5
|-
|  7th || 4
|-
| 8th || 3
|-
|  9th || 2
|-
| 10th || 1
|}

 If a player wins 1st place outright (without the need for a playoff), they are awarded 13 points instead of 12.
 Tour points are shared equally between tied players.

Results 
The wildcards (in italics) are not counted in overall standings.

Notes

References

External links
 

 
Chess competitions
2015 in chess
2016 in chess
2017 in chess
2018 in chess
2019 in chess
2020 in chess
2021 in chess
Sports competition series
Recurring sporting events established in 2015